Viktor Anatolievich Matveev (11 December 1941) is a Russian physicist who has made fundamental contributions to areas of Particle physics, Theoretical Physics Mathematical Physics, Quantum field theory and High energy physics.

References

1941 births
Living people
Russian physicists
Academic staff of Moscow State University
Far Eastern Federal University alumni
People from Krasnoyarsk Krai